Charles F. Rousseau (1908 – 22 October 1976) was a Luxembourg philatelist who was added to the Roll of Distinguished Philatelists in 1973.

Rousseau was the special representative for Luxembourg for the Royal Philatelic Society London.

References

Signatories to the Roll of Distinguished Philatelists
1908 births
1976 deaths
Philatelists
Fellows of the Royal Philatelic Society London